The National Museum of Afghanistan (Dari: موزیم ملی افغانستان, Mūzīyam-e mellī-ye Afghānestān; , Də Afghānistān Millī Mūzīyəm), also known as the Kabul Museum, is a two-story building located 9 km southwest of the center of Kabul in Afghanistan. As of 2014, the museum is under major expansion according to international standards, with a larger size adjoining garden for visitors to relax and walk around. The museum was once considered to be one of the world's finest.

The museum's collection had earlier been one of the most important in Central Asia, with over 100,000 items dating back several millennia, including items from Persian, Buddhist, and Islamic dynasties. With the start of the civil war in 1992, the museum was looted numerous times and destroyed by rockets, resulting in a loss of 70% of the 100,000 objects on display. Since 2007, a number of international organizations have helped to recover over 8,000 artifacts, the most recent being a limestone sculpture from Germany. Approximately 843 artifacts were returned by the United Kingdom in 2012, including the famous 1st Century Begram ivories.

History
The Afghan National Museum was opened in 1919 during the reign of Emir Amanullah Khan (he became King of Afghanistan in 1926). The collection was originally inside the Bagh-e Bala Palace, but was moved in 1922 and began as a 'Cabinet of Curiosities'. It was moved to its present location in 1931. Historian Nancy Dupree co-authored A Guide to the Kabul Museum in 1964. In 1973, a Danish architect was hired to design a new building for the museum, but the plans were never carried out. In 1989, the Bactrian Gold had been moved to an underground vault at the Central Bank of Afghanistan.

After the collapse of President Najibullah's government and the start of a brutal civil war in the early 1990s, the museum was looted numerous times, resulting in the loss of 70% of the 100,000 objects which were then on display. A rocket attack in May 1993 buried ancient potteries under debris. In March 1994, the museum, which had been used as a military base, was struck by rocket fire and largely destroyed. The Ministry of Information and Culture of President Rabbani's government ordered that the 71 museum staff begin moving the inventory to Kabul Hotel (now Serena Hotel) in order to rescue them from further rocketing and shelling. In September 1996, staff at the museum completed the cataloging of the remaining materials. In February and March 2001, the Taliban destroyed countless pieces of art. It was reported in November 2001 that the Taliban had destroyed at least 2,750 ancient works of art during the year.

Between 2003 and 2006, about $350,000 was spent to refurbish the building. Many of the most precious objects had been sealed in metal boxes and removed for safety and were recovered and inventoried in 2004. Some archeological objects were found in vaults in Kabul, while a collection was also discovered in Switzerland. Since 2007, UNESCO and Interpol have helped to recover over 8,000 artefacts, the most recent being a limestone sculpture from Germany and 843 artefacts returned by the British Museum in July 2012, including the famous 1st Century Begram Ivories.

In 2012, the Spanish architecture firm AV 62 Arquitectos won a competition for the new design of the Afghan National Museum. Work began in 2013 to expand the museum according to international standards, with a large adjoining garden for visitors to relax and walk around. The project was completed in June 2021.

In 2013, the Mobile Museum Project was started by the museum in cooperation with the Oriental Institute of the University of Chicago which brought 3D replicas of artefacts from the Kabul museum to schools across Afghanistan from 2013 to 2016.

After the 2021 Taliban offensive and Fall of Kabul, Mohammad Fahim Rahimi, the Director of the museum since 2016, vowed to stay on as director and preserve its collection, as concern grew about a possible repeat of the destruction of a fraction of the collection by the Taliban in the 1990s.

Collections

Many treasures of ivory are stored there, as are antiquities from Kushan, early Buddhism, and early Islam. One of the most famous pieces in the museum, and known to have survived the turbulent period in the 1990s is the Rabatak Inscription of King Kanishka.

Archaeological Materials
As the National Museum Kabul has been the repository for many of the most spectacular archaeological finds in the country. These include the painted frescos from Dilberjin; inscriptions, fragments of architecture, sculpture, metal objects, and coins rescued from the French excavations at Ai-Khanoum and Surkh Kotal; the spectacular collection of objects found at a merchants warehouse in the city of Bagram, which include ivories from India, mirrors from China, and glassware from the Roman Empire; the stucco heads of Hadda; Buddhist sculpture from Tepe Sardar and other monastic institutions in Afghanistan; and a large collection of Islamic art from the Ghazvanid and Timurid periods found at Ghazni.

Numismatic Collection
The National Museum has a large collection of coins, the Austrian numismatist Robert Göbl reported it contained 30,000 objects during a UNESCO sponsored audit of the collection. It is unknown how much the collection has grown since or what was lost during the various wars since. The collection contains the bulk of archaeological material recovered in Afghanistan. It has not been published, but individual hoards and archaeological sites have been. The French Archaeological Delegation in Afghanistan (DAFA) published the coin finds made at the town of Surkh Kotal. Some of the coins found at the excavation of Begram have been published. Part of the Mir Zakah hoard, a very unusual deposit containing enormous numbers of coins from the fourth century BC to third century AD, totalling  silver and copper coins were kept in the museum. Part of the hoard was published by DAFA. The museum has appointed a curator for Numismatics but the collection remains closed to scholars and the general public.

The travelling collection
Certain important parts of the collection, including material from Begram, Ai Khanum, Tepe Fullol, and the gold jewellery from all six of the excavated burials at Tillya Tepe, have been on travelling exhibition since 2006. They have been exhibited at the Guimet Museum in France, four museums in the US, four art galleries in Australia, the Canadian Museum of Civilization, the Bonn Museum in Germany, and most recently to the British Museum. They continue to tour and will eventually return to the National Museum.

Gallery

See also
 Carla Grissmann
 History of Afghanistan
 Bactria (satrapy)

References

External links

 Official website (archive version)
Hidden Treasures from the National Museum, Kabul | National Geographic
 Gold Exhibit
 
  The Pillage of Kabul Museum
 Museum Under Siege by Nancy Hatch Dupree
 
 Association for the Protection of Afghan Archeology

Museums in Afghanistan
Buildings and structures in Kabul
Government buildings completed in 1922
Cultural infrastructure completed in 1922